is a JR West Geibi Line station located in Nishi 4-chōme, Tōkaichi, Miyoshi, Hiroshima Prefecture, Japan. The station was originally opened to serve those on the north bank of the Saijō River in the former Miyoshi-machi in Futami District. Formerly named "Miyoshi Station," it is located near the Tomoe Bridge.

History
1915-06-01: Miyoshi Station opens
1954-11-10: The station is renamed Nishi-Miyoshi Station
1987-04-01: Japan National Railways is privatized, and Nishi-Miyoshi Station becomes a JR West station

Station building and platforms
Nishi-Miyoshi Station features one raised island platform served by two tracks. The station formerly handled freight from the adjoining fertilizer factory, and it still has multiple sidings built to handle the extra trains. While Nishi-Miyoshi was formerly a privately contracted station, it is now unmanned. The station building is an old wooden building with a tile roof.

Surrounding area
Miyoshi Municipal Awaya Elementary
Iwawaki Kofun (a burial mound)
Gōno River
Takataniyama
Miyoshi Country Club Golf Course
Highway access:
Japan National Route 54
Japan National Route 183 (junction with Route 54)

Neighboring Stations
All lines are JR West lines. 
Geibi Line
Miyoshi Station — Nishi-Miyoshi Station — Shiwachi Station

External links
 JR West

Geibi Line
Railway stations in Hiroshima Prefecture